Byron is a city in Ogle County, Illinois, United States, probably best known as the location of the Byron Nuclear Generating Station, one of the last nuclear power plants commissioned in the United States.  Byron is located in Byron Township, along the Rock River.  The population was 3,753 at the 2010 census, up from 2,917 at the 2000 census. The town bills itself as the "Gateway to the Rock River Valley".

History
The city that is now Byron was founded when a settler rode through the area on his way from Galena to Midway.

Geography
Byron is located in Byron Township at the junction of Illinois Route 72 and Illinois Route 2. Byron's topography includes a man-made prairie and the Rock River that passes through the town. It is generally flat and is ideal for farming in most regions.

Byron's average temperature in the spring tends to be 50-65 degrees with considerable rain.  Summer tends to be 75-100 degrees with moderate humidity.  Fall tends to be 35-65 degrees with leaves falling in mid-October.  Winter tends to be cold, with temperatures averaging from freezing to ten or fifteen degrees below freezing in January.

The Iowa, Chicago, and Eastern Railroad passes by the town as well.

Economy
The Byron Nuclear Generating Station, currently owned by Exelon Corporation, is just south of Byron. It began operations in 1985, after ten years of construction. The station provides a great deal of the electricity used in northern Illinois.

Demographics

As of the census of 2000, there were 2,917 people, 1,119 households, and 747 families residing in the city. The racial makeup of the city was 97.70% White, 0.41% African American, 0.14% Native American, 0.31% Asian, 0.31% from other races, and 1.13% from two or more races. Hispanic or Latino of any race were 1.54% of the population. According to a special census taken in 2006, the population of the city has increased to 3,779 since the 2000 census.

There were 1,119 households, out of which 38.6% had children under the age of 18 living with them, 51.4% were married couples living together, 12.0% had a female householder with no husband present, and 33.2% were non-families. 28.8% of all households were made up of individuals, and 13.0% had someone living alone who was 65 years of age or older. The average household size was 2.53 and the average family size was 3.15.

In the city, the population was spread out, with 30.2% under the age of 18, 7.4% from 18 to 24, 30.2% from 25 to 44, 17.4% from 45 to 64, and 14.8% who were 65 years of age or older. The median age was 34 years. For every 100 females, there were 88.3 males. For every 100 females age 18 and over, there were 83.5 males.

The median income for a household in the city was $37,027, and the median income for a family was $46,250. Males had a median income of $40,568 versus $23,221 for females. The per capita income for the city was $17,164. About 6.9% of families and 7.8% of the population were below the poverty line, including 8.3% of those under age 18 and 7.5% of those age 65 or over.

Law and government
Byron is divided into four wards, each of which elects two alderman, giving the city an eight-member council. The eight members of the council are organized into five committees with specific responsibilities, necessarily, given the number of council members, committee memberships overlap.

Elected separately, by the whole city, is the mayor.  The mayor's powers include the right to appoint members of the five standing committees, and to preside over council meetings.  He may also call special meetings of the council.  The mayor receives an annual salary of $9000.

The city also has other elected officials, including a city clerk and a treasurer.  There are also unelected paid positions; these are filled by appointment of the mayor.  These include the comptroller and the city attorney.

Despite the fact that Byron has a mayor-council system of government, the municipal code for Byron contains a provision whereby a city administrator may be appointed, if the mayor and council so desire.  To date, this provision has not been placed into effect.

Festivals/traditions
Turkey Testicle Festival is an annual tradition since 1979.
ByronFest is a carnival held throughout downtown Byron, and other venues, each year in mid-July.

Notable people
 Trisha Paytas, an American YouTuber, model, and singer.
Troy Drake, an offensive tackle with NFL's Philadelphia Eagles and Washington Redskins
 Tom Billeter, men's basketball head coach for Augustana University since 2003
 Wilson Irvine, painter
 Joseph Medill McCormick, congressman and senator
 Francis K. Newcomer, Brigadier general in the United States Army, Governor of the Panama Canal Zone from 1948 to 1952
 Albert Goodwill Spalding, professional baseball player, manager and co-founder of A.G. Spalding sporting goods company

Education
There are three schools: Mary Morgan Elementary School, Byron Middle School, and Byron High School (pre-K-12) serving approximately 2,500 students.  Byron High School placed fourth in the Illinois State Finals Academic Challenge in 2001.

Mary Morgan Elementary School was named as an "Exemplary High Performing Schools" by the U.S. Department of Education's National Blue Ribbon Schools Program, awarded in 2017.

See also
Soldier's Monument (Byron, Illinois)

Notes

External links

Byron Official Website
City Limits
US Census

 
Cities in Illinois
Cities in Ogle County, Illinois
Populated places established in 1835
Rockford metropolitan area, Illinois
1835 establishments in Illinois